The First Step: Chapter Two is the second single album by South Korean boy group Treasure released on September 18, 2020, by YG Entertainment and distributed by YG Plus. It was later released physically on September 22. The single album was released for pre-order on 7 September. The single album was produced by R. Tee, Yena, Q and Trnc. The First Step: Chapter Two is primarily a dance-pop record with influences of future house elements. Commercially, the single album peaked at number two on the Gaon Album Chart and sold 219,000 units.

Background and promotion
Before the group debuted, their label YG Entertainment announced multiple single album releases before a studio album would release. The group debuted with The First Step: Chapter One on August 7 and its title-track "Boy". On September 1, YG uploaded the first teaser for the second single album on various social media profiles. Furthermore, YG called the title track "more intense" than "Boy". One week later, the label shared the release date and pre-orders for two physical versions went live. The title-track "I Love You" was revealed on September 9 and the tracklist the following day. The following days, the label uploaded individual member teasers.

The First Step: Chapter Two was released digitally in various locations on September 18, 2020, alongside the music video for the album's single "I Love You".

Composition 
Melon described that The First Step: Chapter Two "presents a feeling of excitement with a visual that doubles the youth's intense passion and innocence as well as a refreshing feeling". "I Love You" is "a dance-pop song with a dynamic composition with unexpected reversal" and "features a brass line that explodes with the 808 base". Lyrically, the song "states about purely moving straight for the one you love". "B.L.T (Bling Like This)" "metaphorically interpreted the desire to recover time and memories along the path created by the Milky Way and starlight illuminating the darkness". In a live broadcast held by Treasure on September 18, 2020, regarding the song "B.L.T (Bling Like This)", member Mashiho stated, "I felt like I became a boy since it made me feel emotions when I was young", and added, "there were unexpected emotions and charms of love with its fiercer beats" in the lead single.

Commercial performance
According to YG, The First Step: Chapter Two surpassed 200,000 physical pre-orders, making Treasure a "Half a Million Seller". The single album debuted atop the Gaon Album Chart on the 39th issued week of 2020. It debuted at number four on the monthly album chart, selling around 219,000 copies in September.

Track listing

Charts

Weekly charts

Monthly charts

Year-end charts

Certifications and sales

Release history

References

2020 albums
Treasure (band) albums
YG Entertainment albums
Korean-language albums
Single albums